The Remix Album is a compilation album featuring tracks produced and remixed by 4hero. The CD version was released as two discs: the first concentrated on remixes by 4hero of work by other artists; the second featured remixes of music originally produced by 4hero but remixed by other producers.

Track listing

Disc 1 (4hero Remixes)
 Nuyorican Soul – "I Am the Black Gold of the Sun" (4hero Remix) – 8:30
 Courtney Pine – "I've Known Rivers" (4hero Remix) – 8:01
 Scarface – "I Seen a Man Die" (4hero Remix) – 4:32
 Metalheadz – "Inner City Life" (4hero Remix) – 6:48
 Ultra Naté – "Twisted" (4hero Remix) – 6:44
 Focus – "Having Your Fun" (4hero Remix) – 6:07
 Shade of Soul – "Give in to Me" (4hero Remix) – 7:21
 Pre YMO – "Indo" (4hero Remix) – 8:04
 Terry Callier – "Love Theme from Spartacus" (4hero Remix) – 6:15
 Shaun Escoffery – "Into the Blue" (4hero Remix) – 4:15
 Marcos Valle – "Escape" (4hero Remix) – 6:18
 4hero – "Naima" (4hero Version) – 5:51

Disc 2 (4hero Remixed)
 4hero – "Hold It Down" (Bugz in the Attic Remix) – 7:22
 4hero – "Star Chasers" (Masters at Work Remix) – 10:33
 4hero – "The Action" (Visioneers Remix) – 4:16
 4hero – "We Who Are Not as Others" (Jazzanova Remix) – 7:09
 4hero – "Ways of Thought" (Restless Soul Remix) – 7:17
 4hero – "Escape That" (New Sector Movements Remix) – 8:55
 4hero – "Universal Love" (Metalheadz Remix) – 4:42
 4hero – "9 by 9" (Marcus Intalex & ST Files Remix) – 6:26
 4hero – "Hold It Down" (Exemen Remix) – 4:54
 4hero – "Star Chasers" (DJ Spinna Remix) – 5:15
 4hero – "9 by 9" (King Britt Remix) – 5:32
 4hero – "Better Place" (Marcus Intalex & ST Files Remix) – 6:28

Miscellanea
 "Naima" is a cover of the written and performed track by John Coltrane, though 4hero's version is based on group The Visitors (aka Earl and Carl Grubbs) brothers 1971 version from their album Neptune (1972) on the Cobblestone label.

4hero albums

2004 remix albums
2004 compilation albums